The following is a list of lakes and reservoirs in the state of Kentucky in the United States.

 Lake Barkley (extends into Tennessee)
 Barren River Lake
 Beaver Lake
 Boltz Lake
 Buckhorn Lake
 Bullock Pen Lake
 Lake Beshear
 Cannon Creek Lake
 Lake Carnico
 Carr Creek Lake (formerly Carr Fork Lake)
 Cave Run Lake
 Cedar Creek Lake
 Cranks Creek Lake
 Lake Cumberland
 Dale Hollow Lake (extends into Tennessee)
 Dewey Lake
 Doe Run Lake
 Elk Lake
 Elmer Davis Lake
 Fishtrap Lake
 Grayson Lake
 Green River Lake
 Greenbo Lake
 Guist Creek Lake
 Herrington Lake
 Kentucky Lake (extends into Tennessee).
 Kincaid Lake
 Laurel River Lake
 Lake Linville
 Lake Malone
 Martins Fork Lake
 Nolin River Lake
 Paintsville Lake
 Pan Bowl Lake
 Rough River Lake
 Shanty Hollow Lake
 Shelby Lake
 Swan Lake
 Taylorsville Lake
 Wilgreen Lake
 Williamstown Lake
 Willisburg Lake
 Wood Creek Lake
 Yatesville Lake

See also

External links
Kentucky State Park regional and specific maps

Lakes
Kentucky